San Nicolas, officially the Municipality of San Nicolas,  is a 5th class municipality in the province of Batangas, Philippines. According to the 2020 census, it has a population of 23,908 people.

History

In 1955, the barrios of San Nicolas, Hipit, Bangin, Pansipit, Calangay, Sinturisan, Talang, Abelo, Balete, Bancoro, Saimsim, Maabud, Munlawin, Tambo, Calumala, Alas-as, Calawit, and Pulang-Bato were separated from the municipality of Taal and constituted into a new and separate municipality known as San Nicolas. In 1957, the following sitios were converted into independent barrios: Burol from Tambo, Tagudtod from Munlawin, Kalawit and Pulang-Bato from Alas-as, and Baluk-Baluk from Hipit.

In 1961, the barrios of Calumala, Tambo, Saimsim and Bucal were separated from San Nicolas and annexed to the new municipality of Santa Teresita.

Geography
According to the Philippine Statistics Authority, the municipality has a land area of  constituting  of the  total area of Batangas.

Barangays
San Nicolas is politically subdivided into 18 barangays.

Climate

Demographics

In the 2020 census, San Nicolas had a population of 23,908.

Economy

Sister city
 Tagaytay, Cavite, Philippines

References

External links

[ Philippine Standard Geographic Code]

Municipalities of Batangas
Populated places on Taal Lake